Invasion of the Cat-People is an original novel written by Gary Russell and based on the long-running British science fiction television series Doctor Who. It features the Second Doctor, Ben and Polly.

Plot
Earth has been invaded twice: first, many millennia ago by beings searching for a new energy source, and then more recently, by alien marauders known as the Cat-People, who intend to finish the job. To stop them, the newly regenerated Doctor, along with Ben and Polly, teams up with a group of amateur ghost-hunters and a white witch on an expansive journey that takes them from twentieth-century Cumbria, to the Arabian deserts and Australia from 40,000 years ago.

Continuity
Based on the events of the Big Finish audio The Pyralis Effect, it can be argued that the most likely location for the cat peoples' home planet is Delta Pavonis IV.

References

External links
The Cloister Library - Invasion of the Cat-People

1995 British novels
1995 science fiction novels
Fiction set around Delta Pavonis
Novels by Gary Russell
Second Doctor novels
Virgin Missing Adventures
Fiction set in 1994